Charles Dewayne Hayes (born May 29, 1965) is an American former professional baseball third baseman and former coach for the FCL Phillies. Hayes played in Major League Baseball for the San Francisco Giants, Philadelphia Phillies, New York Yankees, Colorado Rockies, Pittsburgh Pirates, Milwaukee Brewers, and Houston Astros from 1988 through 2001. He was a member of the Yankees' 1996 World Series championship team that beat the Atlanta Braves. He batted and threw right-handed.

Little League
Hayes played for the South Region champions (Hub City from Hattiesburg, Mississippi) in the first round of the 1977 Little League World Series.

Early career

San Francisco Giants (1988–1989)
The San Francisco Giants drafted Hayes in the fourth round of the 1983 Major League Baseball (MLB) Draft. He made his MLB debut with the Giants on September 11, 1988, where he hit .091 over seven games.

Philadelphia Phillies (1989–1991)
On June 18, 1989, the Giants traded Hayes with Dennis Cook and Terry Mulholland to the Philadelphia Phillies for Steve Bedrosian and a player to be named later, who turned out to be Rick Parker. On August 15, 1990, he was a decisive part of a unique baseball game. While Mulholland pitched a no-hitter (not giving up a single hit, walking, or hitting a batsman, and retired every opposing player he faced), Parker reached base on a throwing error by Hayes, spoiling an otherwise perfect game. Hayes later redeemed himself, however, by snaring Gary Carter's line drive for the final out of the 9th inning and thus preserving Mulholland's no-hitter.

First stint with the Yankees (1992)
Before the 1992 season, Hayes was traded to the New York Yankees to complete a trade made on January 8, 1992, in which the Phillies acquired Darrin Chapin from the Yankees for a player to be named later. He hit .257 with a career-high 100 strikeouts.

After the 1992 season, the Colorado Rockies drafted Hayes from the Yankees as the third pick in the 1992 MLB expansion draft. The Yankees attempted to revoke Hayes' assignment to the Rockies, charging that the Florida Marlins were not properly compensating the Yankees for lost territory in Fort Lauderdale, Florida, where the Yankees had a minor league team. The Commissioner of Baseball rejected the claim, and Hayes joined the Rockies.

Colorado Rockies (1993–1994)
Hayes was part of the inaugural Rockies team in 1993 and played third base during their first ever game. During the season, he compiled a career-high 45 doubles (leading the National League), 25 home runs, and 98 runs batted in. In 1994, he compiled 23 doubles and 50 runs batted in before the 1994–95 Major League Baseball strike unexpectedly ended the season. He was granted free agency on December 23.

Return to the Phillies (1995)
Hayes signed with the Phillies for the 1995 season, where he hit 11 home runs and 85 RBIs. He became a free agent after the 1995 season, and signed a four-year contract with the Pittsburgh Pirates.

Pittsburgh Pirates & New York Yankees (1996–1997)
With the Pirates, he hit .248 over 128 games to begin the season. On August 30, 1996, the Pirates traded Hayes to the New York Yankees for a player to be named later, later choosing Chris Corn.

Hayes hit .284 over 20 games for the Yankees during the season and was added to the postseason roster. He appeared in three games during the 1996 American League Division Series against the Texas Rangers and was one for seven with a run batted in. During the 1996 American League Championship Series against the Baltimore Orioles, Hayes played in four games and went one for seven with two walks. Hayes played in five of the six games in the 1996 World Series against the Atlanta Braves, collecting three hits and one run batted in, along with five strikeouts. In Game 6 of the 1996 World Series, he caught Mark Lemke's pop up in foul territory behind third base to end the game and give the Yankees their first World Series championship since 1978.

Hayes hit .258 over 100 games for the Yankees in 1997, including 53 runs batted in and 40 walks. In the 1997 American League Division Series against the Cleveland Indians, he went 5 for 15 with one run batted in. After the series, the Yankees traded Hayes to the Giants for Alberto Castillo and Chris Singleton.

Later career

San Francisco Giants (1998–1999)
Hayes played in 111 games in 1998 and his batting average increased to .286 while hitting 12 home runs and driving in 62 runs. The next year, he saw his playing time decrease as he saw action in just 95 games, his lowest total since 1989. He finished the season with a dismal .205 average while collecting just 54 hits, then a career low.

Mets and Brewers (2000)
Hayes became a free agent again after the 1999 season, and he signed with the New York Mets on January 20, 2000. They released him during spring training, however, and he instead caught on with the Milwaukee Brewers for the 2000 season. During the season, he hit .251 while driving in 46 runs.

Houston Astros and retirement (2001)
He signed with the Houston Astros for the 2001 season, but collected just 10 hits over 31 games (a .200 average) and was released on July 9.

In a 14-season career, Hayes posted a .262 batting average with 144 home runs and 740 RBI in 1,547 games played.

Post-playing career
Hayes currently gives baseball lessons and operates a team along with a facility for the instruction of baseball, called "Big League Baseball Academy" in Tomball, Texas. His son Tyree pitched professionally from 2006 through 2012. On July 19, 2009, Hayes made his first appearance at the Yankees annual Old-Timers' Day. He returned to Old-Timers' Day again in 2010, 2011, 2012, 2013, and 2014.

Hayes rejoined the Philadelphia Phillies as a coach for the Phillies Triple-A Affiliate the Lehigh Valley IronPigs.

Hayes was named as a coach for the FCL Phillies for the 2018 and 2019 seasons.

Personal life
Hayes is the father of Ke'Bryan Hayes and former minor league pitcher Tyree Hayes.

Hayes is a 1983 graduate of Forrest County Agricultural High School (FCAHS) in Brooklyn, Mississippi.  FCAHS is the last fully-operational agricultural school in Mississippi.

See also

 List of Major League Baseball annual doubles leaders
 List of second-generation Major League Baseball players

References

External links

Charlie Hayes at Baseball Almanac
 Charlie Hayes at Baseball Library
Charlie Hayes at Astros Daily

1965 births
Living people
African-American baseball coaches
African-American baseball players
Baseball coaches from Mississippi
Baseball players from Mississippi
Clinton Giants players
Colorado Rockies players
Fresno Giants players
Great Falls Giants players
Houston Astros players
Major League Baseball third basemen
Milwaukee Brewers players
Minor league baseball coaches
New York Yankees players
Philadelphia Phillies players
Phoenix Firebirds players
Pittsburgh Pirates players
San Francisco Giants players
Scranton/Wilkes-Barre Red Barons players
Shreveport Captains players
Sportspeople from Hattiesburg, Mississippi
21st-century African-American people
20th-century African-American sportspeople